The Platinum Collection is a compilation album released by Faith No More in 2006.

Track listing

Personnel
 Mike Patton – Vocals
 Chuck Mosley – Vocals
 Jon Hudson – Guitar
 Trey Spruance – Guitar
 "Big" Jim Martin – Guitar
 Billy Gould – Bass
 Roddy Bottum – Keyboards
 Mike Bordin – Drums
 Joe Arditti – Project Manager
 Ben Lister – Compiler

Charts
 UK Albums Chart – 38

Footnotes

Faith No More albums
Alternative metal compilation albums
2005 compilation albums
Warner Records compilation albums